Carpal Tunnel Syndrome is the debut studio album by Canadian turntablist Kid Koala, released on Ninja Tune in 2000. It peaked at number 33 on the UK Independent Albums Chart. It was nominated for Alternative Album of the Year at the 2001 Juno Awards.

Production
Carpal Tunnel Syndrome was made by hand-cutting vinyl records onto an 8-track recorder without computer splicing or samplers. The album took Kid Koala 4 years to record, more than the 6 months he originally told Ninja Tunes it would take.

Critical reception

Steve Huey of AllMusic gave the album 5 stars out of 5, saying: "It's capable of making turntablism engaging to a wider audience." He added, "[Kid Koala is] able to bring so much personality and entertainment value to his work, which makes Carpal Tunnel Syndrome arguably the most appealing turntablist album yet released." Matt Byrnie of PopMatters said, "Kid Koala's real charm is not his virtuosity, per se, but his ability to express the simple joy of playing with records."

In 2018, the album won the Polaris Heritage Prize Jury Award in the 1996–2005 category.

Track listing

Charts

References

External links
 

2000 debut albums
Kid Koala albums
Ninja Tune albums